Quo is the seventh studio album by the English rock band Status Quo. Issued in May 1974, it features Francis Rossi, Rick Parfitt, Alan Lancaster and John Coghlan, and reached #2 in the UK. Like its predecessor Hello!, it consisted entirely of songs written or cowritten by the group. The only guest musicians were Bob Young and Tom Parker, who played harmonica and piano respectively on "Break the Rules".

The album is regarded as one of their heaviest, possibly due to the influence of bassist Alan Lancaster, who cowrote six of the eight tracks. "When we wrote 'Drifting Away'," recalled Parfitt, "it sounded so, so heavy. That rhythm was constant, right in your face. It was just such a turn-on. That's where my head was at back then. You know: just let it fucking rock."

The UK LP contained a gatefold insert with a picture of the band playing live on one side, and the lyrics on the other. The sleeve art was by British artist Dave Field.

The band believed the opening "Backwater" to be the most suitable candidate for a single. However, the only track released as a single was "Break the Rules", in April 1974. It peaked in the UK at #8. The B-side of the single was "Lonely Night", which was not on an album until it became a bonus track on the 2005 reissue of Quo. Two years after release, "Lonely Night" was plagiarised by Australian band the Angels in their song "Am I Ever Gonna See Your Face Again", for which Status Quo subsequently received royalties.

Track listing

2005 reissue bonus track
 Lonely Night (Rossi, Parfitt, Lancaster, Coghlan, Young) – 3:26

Personnel
Status Quo
 Francis Rossi – guitar, vocals
 Rick Parfitt – guitar, vocals
 Alan Lancaster – bass, vocals
 John Coghlan – drums

Additional personnel
 Bob Young – harmonica
 Tom Parker – keyboards
 Status Quo – producers
 Damon Lyon-Shaw – engineer and mix
 Richard Manwaring, Andy Miller – assistant engineers
 Dave Field – illustration and design

Charts

Certifications

References

Status Quo (band) albums
1974 albums
A&M Records albums
Vertigo Records albums